Goat Horns is the debut studio album by Ukrainian black metal band Nokturnal Mortum. It was released on cassette tape in July 1997, through Morbid Noizz Productions.

Track listing 

Lyrics have not been published to any song except for "Kolyada".

Personnel
Knjaz Varggoth: Guitars, Vocals
Karpath: Guitars
Sataroth: Keyboards
Saturious: Keyboards
Xaar Quath: Bass
Munruthel: Drums

References 

1997 albums
Nokturnal Mortum albums